Denver Oldham (September 15, 1936 – May 6, 2012) was an American concert pianist and recording artist. A Steinway Artist, he had to his credit twelve European concert tours, two South American concert tours, as well as numerous domestic performances. He recorded ten albums, paying special attention to the works of neglected American composers. He was born in Long Island, New York, to Scottish immigrants.

Early life
Denver Oldham first began formal piano lessons at the age of five with Edna Dalton after his kindergarten teacher discovered him improvising on nursery rhymes. By the age of twelve he was performing with symphonies in the Long Island area regularly, and he soon held his first public solo recital at the behest of the Music Education League.

Career

Oldham graduated from the Juilliard School of Music, where he studied under Joseph Bloch and Leland Thompson. He subsequently studied in London with Dame Myra Hess and Ilona Kabos and at the Aspen Music Festival with Alexander Uninsky. At the age of 24, Oldham went on his first European concert tour, which spanned Copenhagen, Zurich, Oslo, The Hague, and Vienna. In 1961, he made his New York City debut at The Town Hall. He later performed at both Philharmonic Hall (later renamed Avery Fisher Hall) in the Lincoln Center for the Performing Arts and at Carnegie Hall. Continuing European tours have taken him to Basel, Amsterdam, Berlin, Brussels, Dublin, and London.

Beginning in 1982, Denver Oldham built up a library of recordings highlighting the works of varied, often underrepresented or minority American composers. The list included composers such as Charles Tomlinson Griffes, John Alden Carpenter, R. Nathaniel Dett, William Grant Still, John Knowles Paine, and Angelo Musolino. He also recorded the works of European composers Jacques Ibert, Enrique Granados, and Franz Liszt. Oldham's first album, Charles Tomlinson Griffes: Collected Works for Piano, sold more than 80,000 copies, and his recordings were featured on the National Public Radio show Performance Today.

Honors
The National Guild of Piano Teachers awarded Denver Oldham the Paderewski Gold Medal, and the Music Education League awarded him a Gold Medal on two separate occasions. His albums Charles Tomlinson Griffes: Collected Works for Piano and John Alden Carpenter: Collected Piano Works were each nominated for a Grammy Award. Time magazine named John Alden Carpenter: Collected Piano Works as one of the top ten best classical recordings of 1986. Equinox Piano Concerto from the 2006 album Angelo Musolino: Orchestral Works was nominated for the Pulitzer Prize in music.

Later life
Denver Oldham later moved to Augusta, Georgia, where he offered piano lessons. Although his lessons were very pricey, he had a select number of students which he catered to greatly.

Discography
Charles Tomlinson Griffes: Collected Works for Piano (1982) New World Records
John Alden Carpenter: Collected Piano Works (1986) New World Records
R. Nathaniel Dett: Piano Works (1992) New World Records
John Knowles Paine: Selected Piano Works (1995) New World Records
William Grant Still, R. Nathaniel Dett: Piano Music (1996) Altarus Records
Jacques Ibert: Piano Works (2003) Altarus Records
Angelo Musolino: Orchestral Works (2006) Albany Records

References

"Musician in Good Company on Magazine's 'Best of '86' List". (January 26, 1987). Greenville Piedmont, p. 1B.
Hinton, Gary (October 30, 1991). "'Poet of Piano' Shares Music with World". Columbia County Chronicle, pp. 1,12.

External links
Track listing for Charles Tomlinson Griffes: Collected Works for Piano
Track listing for John Alden Carpenter: Collected Piano Works
Track listing for R. Nathaniel Dett: Piano Works
Track listing for John Knowles Paine: Selected Piano Works
Track listing for William Grant Still, R. Nathaniel Dett: Piano Music
Track listing for Jacques Ibert: Piano Works
Track listing for Angelo Musolino: Orchestral Works

American classical pianists
American male pianists
Aspen Music Festival and School alumni
Juilliard School alumni
Living people
1936 births
20th-century American pianists
21st-century classical pianists
20th-century American male musicians
21st-century American male musicians
21st-century American pianists